The first conference of the 2021 PBA 3x3 season started on November 20, 2021, and ended on December 29, 2021. It consisted of six two-day legs and a grand final. Limitless Appmasters became the conference's Grand Champion after defeating Platinum Karaoke in the Grand Finals, 18–16.

Teams

1st leg

Groupings
The preliminary drawing of lots were held on November 13, 2021, at the Ynares Sports Arena in Pasig, where the first leg was also held.

Preliminary round

Pool A

Pool B

Pool C

Knockout stage
TNT Tropang Giga defeated Meralco Bolts 3x3 in the finals, 21–18, to become the first leg winners.

Bracket

Knockout game

Quarterfinals

Semifinals

Third place game

Finals

Final standings

2nd leg

Groupings

Preliminary round

Pool A

Pool B

Pool C

Knockout stage
Meralco Bolts 3x3 defeated Platinum Karaoke in the finals, 21–16, to become the second leg winners.

Bracket

Knockout game

Quarterfinals

Semifinals

Third place game

Finals

Final standings

3rd leg

Groupings

Preliminary round

Pool A

Pool B

Pool C

Knockout stage
Sista Super Sealers defeated Pioneer Pro Tibay in the finals, 20–13, to become the third leg winners.

Bracket

Knockout game

Quarterfinals

Semifinals

Third place game

Finals

Final standings

4th leg

Groupings

Preliminary round

Pool A

Pool B

Pool C

Knockout stage
Purefoods TJ Titans defeated Meralco Bolts 3x3 in the finals, 21–16, to become the fourth leg winners.

Bracket

Knockout game

Quarterfinals

Semifinals

Third place game

Finals

Final standings

5th leg

Groupings

Preliminary round

Pool A

Pool B

Pool C

Knockout stage
Limitless Appmasters defeated TNT Tropang Giga in the finals, 14–13, to become the fifth leg winners.

Bracket

Knockout game

Quarterfinals

Semifinals

Third place game

Finals

Final standings

6th leg

Groupings

Preliminary round

Pool A

Pool B

Pool C

Knockout stage
Limitless Appmasters defeated TNT Tropang Giga in the finals, 21–18, to become the sixth leg winners.

Bracket

Knockout game

Quarterfinals

Semifinals

Third place game

Finals

Final standings

Legs summary

Grand Finals

Preliminary round

Pool A

Pool B

Knockout stage

Bracket
Seed refers to the position of the team after six legs. Letter and number inside parentheses denotes the pool letter and pool position of the team, respectively, after the preliminary round of the Grand Finals.

Quarterfinals

Semifinals

Third place game

Finals

Notes

References

3x3 1st
Pba 3x3
Pba 1st conference